Collagen alpha-3(V) chain is a protein that in humans is encoded by the COL5A3 gene.

This gene encodes an alpha chain for one of the low abundance fibrillar collagens. Fibrillar collagen molecules are trimers that can be composed of one or more types of alpha chains. Type V collagen is found in tissues containing type I collagen and appears to regulate the assembly of heterotypic fibers composed of both type I and type V collagen. This gene product is closely related to type XI collagen and it is possible that the collagen chains of types V and XI constitute a single collagen type with tissue-specific chain combinations. Mutations in this gene are thought to be responsible for the symptoms of a subset of patients with Ehlers-Danlos syndrome type III. Messages of several sizes can be detected in northern blots but sequence information cannot confirm the identity of the shorter messages.

References

Further reading

Collagens